The Scholar of Moab is a 2011 novel written by Steven L. Peck.

The plot centers on Hyrum Thayne, a colorful Moab, Utah character, and the unresolved mysteries in his life.

The novel received an AML Award for best novel in 2011.

Reception

The Scholar of Moab was part of By Common Consent's essential readings in Mormonism and is read in at least one course on Mormon literature. Rosalynde Welch writing in Dialogue called it "a wonderfully strange, deeply philosophical narrative that interrogates the nature of the first person" while drawing on Mormon traditions of diaries and regionalism.

References

External links 
 The Scholar of Moab official site
 The Scholar of Moab on the publisher's website Torrey House Press
 The Scholar of Moab on Goodreads
 The Scholar of Moab on Google Books
 The Scholar of Moab review on Deseret News
 The Scholar of Moab review on By Common Consent

2011 American novels
Mormon fiction